The 2016–17 LSU Lady Tigers basketball team represented Louisiana State University during the 2016–17 NCAA Division I women's basketball season college basketball season. The Lady Tigers, led by sixth year head coach Nikki Fargas, played their home games at Pete Maravich Assembly Center as members of the Southeastern Conference. They finished the season 20–12, 8–8 in SEC play to finish in seventh place. They defeated Ole Miss in the second round advanced to the quarterfinals of the SEC women's tournament to Mississippi State. They received an at-large bid to the NCAA women's tournament where they lost to California in the first round.

Roster

Schedule and Results

|-
!colspan=12 style="background:#33297B; color:#FDD023;"| Exhibition

|-
!colspan=12 style="background:#33297B; color:#FDD023;"| Non-conference regular season

|-
!colspan=12 style="background:#33297B; color:#FDD023;"| SEC regular season

|-
!colspan=12 style="background:#33297B;"| SEC Women's tournament

|-
!colspan=12 style="background:#33297B;"| NCAA Women's tournament

Source:

Rankings
2016–17 NCAA Division I women's basketball rankings

See also
 2016–17 LSU Tigers basketball team

References

External links
 Official Team Website

LSU Lady Tigers basketball seasons
LSU
LSU
LSU
LSU